Bawitius is an extinct genus of giant polypterid from the Upper Cretaceous (lower Cenomanian) Bahariya Formation of Egypt. The type species is B. bartheli, named as a species of Polypterus in 1984, and the genus etymology comes from Bawiti, the principal settlement of the Bahariya Oasis in Egypt. It is known from the holotype TU-B SFB 69 Vb 003 (= Bah 5/12-016): left ectopterygoid scales and some sparse scales.

Morphology
Compared to modern polypterids, Bawitius was enormous: the Bawitius holotype ectopterygoid is five times larger than the one of Polypterus and the scales are unusually large, too: these remains suggest the living animal may have been up to 300 centimeters (9.8 feet) in length.

The morphology of Bawitius is different enough to justify its assignment to a new genus apart from Polypterus. Unique features of the genus are, for example, an anterioposteriorly elongated contact between the lateral process and the maxilla, a high, narrow ectopterygoid and the presence of 14 teeth in the main tooth row.

The scales are different, too, apart from size, from those of modern polypterids: they feature a discontinuous ganoine layer, a rectilinear shape, and small articular processes.

Ecological relevance
The existence of drastically different polypterids such as Bawitius and Serenoichthys corroborates the existence of a variety of polypterid fishes in the ecosystems of Late Cretaceous of North Africa and Brazil.

References

Polypteridae
Prehistoric ray-finned fish genera
Cretaceous bony fish
Prehistoric fish of Africa
Bahariya Formation
Fossil taxa described in 2012